Foundation Christian Academy (FCA) is a private Christian school serving pre-kindergarten through high school students located in Valrico, Florida, United States. It was established in 1992. Foundation Christian Academy enrolls over 400 students. Originally co-located in Bell Shoals Church of Christ, the school moved to its current location on the former site of a miniature horse farm on Lithia-Pinecrest road in 2005. In 2016, the school purchased 20 additional acres of land adjacent to the existing 6.5-acre site. A gymnasium was completed in the fall of 2016.

Athletics 

The school's athletic teams are referred to as the Panthers. FCA has competed in the FHSAA since 2008 and fields teams in basketball, cross-country, soccer, and volleyball. By 2020 the school plans to add football, flag football, and track and field. The school also hosts the Tony Saladino III Baseball Academy.

Notes 

Christian schools in Florida
Educational institutions established in 1992
High schools in Hillsborough County, Florida
Private high schools in Florida
Private middle schools in Florida
1992 establishments in Florida